is a hack and slash video game developed by Omega Force (ω-force) and published by Koei (with distribution handled by THQ for the PlayStation 2 in PAL regions). It is third in the Dynasty Warriors series in North America and the second in the Shin Sangokumusou series in Japan. It is a spin-off from the video game Romance of the Three Kingdoms and based around a series of books by the same name, written by Luo Guanzhong. It contains a number of fictional and non-fictional elements from the same era in Chinese history that Romance of the Three Kingdoms is set but follows the main events of part of the story which is to unify China under the single rule of a kingdom.

Dynasty Warriors 3 was the first in the series to introduce a two player mode and numerous other improvements over Dynasty Warriors 2. New stages, characters, weapons, attacks and music are introduced providing a completely new experience to a player that has played Dynasty Warriors 2 before. The gameplay engine and the graphics engine have also been updated, providing higher quality environments, textures and general overall graphics. Only one expansion was released for the game, Dynasty Warriors 3: Xtreme Legends and it was the first in the Xtreme Legends series.

Gameplay
In Dynasty Warriors 3 the player takes control of an officer and must attempt to defeat the enemy commander. The player must make their way through the stage defeating soldiers and enemy officers while trying to keep their commander alive. As well as hundreds of soldiers in each stage, there are stage specific events to complete that can help the player's army and raise their morale. A higher morale means allied soldiers will attack more frequently and will be more likely to follow through with their combination attacks. To make this possible, officers and commanders have superhuman abilities and have the capability to kill hundreds of enemy soldiers per stage.

The main play mode of the game is Musou mode, the story mode of the Dynasty Warriors series. Each playable character of the three main nations have their own Musou mode which consists of a number of stages that resemble events in Romance of the Three Kingdoms. The Musou mode for each character is a linear story where the user cannot change how the story progresses. The story progression for Cao Cao, Liu Bei and Sun Jian and officers from their respective kingdoms have the closest relation to the Romance of the Three Kingdoms story.

Initially there are 15 available characters to play as, new and returning characters can be unlocked by performing special events during battle or simply meeting them during battle. Each playable character has their own unique weapon that can be upgraded and allows for a maximum of 4 levels of weapon. When the next level of weapon is obtained, its strength is greater than the level below it and adds one extra attack to the player's maximum number of attacks.

Items are also hidden throughout stages and can also be obtained by defeating officers. There are three types of items in game, normal items, red items and weapons which can be equipped before the stage begins and will increase the player's statistics. Red items are specialised items than cause a special effect, such as starting the stage mounted on a horse or giving the player the ability to shoot fire arrows.

Dynasty Warriors 3 has an RPG element to it where the player can increase the attack, defence, life bar or Musou bar of the characters. This can be achieved by defeating enemy officers and gate captains who will drop items that will increase the aforementioned statistics. Although it is not necessary to collect these items, it is helpful to the player as in later stages as enemies grow in strength.

The two player mode (new to Dynasty Warriors 3) allows players to either go head-to-head in one-on-one fights or play co-operatively in any of the stages. The screen is split horizontally with player one on top and the second below. In one-on-one fights the characters statistics are reduced to their default to allow for a fair battle, relying more on the player's skill rather than who has the stronger character. In co-operative play the characters retain their saved statistics, there are no alterations to the stage and the players gain the ability to perform a more powerful version of their Musou attack (Special Attack). If the players perform their Musou attack at the same time within range of each other, the attack gains a lightning element and deals extra damage to enemies that are hit.

Plot

Setting
Dynasty Warriors 3 is set across ancient China in the Three Kingdoms era. The game begins at the fall of the Han dynasty shortly after the death of the Emperor Ling when the leader of the Way of Peace, Zhang Jiao, led an uprising against the Empire.

The game features a strong mix of fact and fiction from Chinese history and often exaggerates characters and their personalities. For example, Lu Bu is portrayed as a virtually unbeatable, violent maniac. Most of the events and stages are reported to have occurred in the Three Kingdoms era during the struggle of power. The three kingdoms primarily involved, Shu, Wu and Wei, each sought power enough to overthrow the other two and unify China under their rule. Although the story in Dynasty Warriors is not perfect in the sense that it does not accurately follow the historical events, it has been changed to make the game more playable and less repetitive. For example, a number of the characters in the game died in the time frame that the game is set, but they still appear in later stages. The game features environments resembling that of ancient China and various items from the era such as fairy wine and dim sum.

It also touches on mysticism as some characters (Zhuge Liang, Sima Yi, Pang Tong, Zhang Jiao) have either magical elements in their attacks or completely magical attacks.

Stages
Many of the stages are recreations of notable battles present historically or from the novel Romance of the Three Kingdoms, while original creations became more common with the newer installments.

Characters

* Denotes new characters to the series
Bold denotes default characters

The characters in Dynasty Warriors 3 are based around real and semi-fictional characters from Romance of the Three Kingdoms and that era, where some characters personalities and traits have been exaggerated and where some remain fairly true to the novel. Females of that era did not participate in any of the battles but there are a number of female playable characters in the game (Diao Chan, Xiao Qiao, Da Qiao, Zhen Ji, Sun Shang Xiang, Zhu Rong, Nu Wa). Zhu Rong and Nu Wa are exceptions as Zhu Rong was said to be the only female to have fought in that era and Nu Wa's character is fictional and based on ancient myth.

Reception

The game was highly anticipated after its release being announced because of its numerous new features and improvements of the last in the series. Afterwards, it was met with positive to average reception upon release; GameRankings and Metacritic gave it a score of 77% and 78 out of 100 for the PlayStation 2 version, and 76% and 70 out of 100 for the Xbox version.

In just under four months, over 1 million copies of Dynasty Warriors 3 had been sold in North America and Japan combined and made it the first of Koei's games to pass one million sales on a single platform and making it a platinum title. Not only that but it topped the sales charts for five consecutive weeks and, according to Famitsu, it was ranked the 9th best selling game of 2001.

Dynasty Warriors 3 still retains a number of the bad features that were in the previous game such as fogging and low quality English voice actors. Although the English voices were poor (they have gained a cult-like status among fans of the series), the player has the choice to turn on Japanese voices and they are considered to be of a much higher quality. IGN strongly criticized the Xbox version over the sound, both music and the voice acting. Despite a number of negative points coming up throughout the review it scored 6.8/10 and the reviewer saw it had potential to become a very good game.

Famitsu gave the PS2 version 34 out of 40. Chi Kong Lui of GameCritics.com looked past the sound and graphical flaws and concentrated more on the gameplay and setting, giving a high score of 9/10. He gave high praise to how much the game was based on the original Romance of the Three Kingdoms story and even went as far as saying "All the costuming of the 3D models is ethnically authentic and beautifully lavished" whereas a number of reviews described the graphical quality as being plain and blurry (Such as the said IGN review).  It is also notable that the IGN review was based on the PS2 version, which has more fog and slowdown (especially in multi-player) when compared to the Xbox version, and those were his two heaviest faults of the game.

Awards
On March 6, 2003, Dynasty Warriors 3 received Animation Magazine "Best Overall Game Animation" award. This was Koei's first award for a Dynasty Warriors game.

Expansions

Dynasty Warriors 3: Xtreme Legends

Dynasty Warriors 3: Xtreme Legends (真・三國無双2 猛将伝 (Shin Sangokumusou 2 Moushouden) in Japan)) is the first Xtreme Legends installment by publisher Koei and developer Omega Force. This expansion to Dynasty Warriors 3 was released on January 11, 2003, within the US and Europe.

Xtreme Legends added several new features to Dynasty Warriors 3, including new items and the ability to fully customize bodyguards.  Xtreme Legends also included a Musou Mode for the playable characters who did not belong to either Wu, Wei, or Shu (Diao Chan, Lu Bu, Zhang Jiao, Dong Zhuo, Yuan Shao, Zhu Rong and Meng Huo). Xtreme Legends also allowed players to obtain a fifth-level weapon for each character and added two new difficulty levels: Beginner and Expert. (Otherwise referred to as "Novice" and "Very Hard" in game, respectively.)

The player can also import content from the DW3 disc while playing Xtreme Legends by using the "Load Original" option. If played by itself, DW3:XL only features its own scenarios and Musou modes. It can, however, copy data from a previously saved DW3 file on the memory card, but only if there's already a DW3 data before creating DW3:XL save data.

Xtreme Legends was met with average reception upon release, as GameRankings gave it a score of 71%, while Metacritic gave it 72 out of 100. Famitsu gave it a score of 33 out of 40.

References

External links
 
 

2001 video games
Dynasty Warriors
Koei games
THQ games
PlayStation 2 games
PlayStation Network games
Xbox games
Crowd-combat fighting games
Split-screen multiplayer games
Video games developed in Japan
Video games set in China
Video games based on Chinese mythology
Multiplayer and single-player video games

fi:Dynasty Warriors 3
zh:真·三国无双2